The electoral district of Normanby was a Legislative Assembly electorate in the state of Queensland from 1872 until 1949.

History

Normanby was created by the Electoral Districts Act in 1872 as a single-member seat, stretching from the coastal area around St Lawrence, west towards Clermont. Over the years of redistributions, Normanby became an inland electorate to the west of Rockhampton. Normanby was abolished in the 1949 redistribution which split it across the Electoral district of Mackenzie, the Electoral district of Keppel, and the Electoral district of Callide.

Members

The following people represented Normanby:

See also
 Electoral districts of Queensland
 Members of the Queensland Legislative Assembly by year
 :Category:Members of the Queensland Legislative Assembly by name

References

Former electoral districts of Queensland
1873 establishments in Australia
1950 establishments in Australia
Constituencies established in 1873
Constituencies disestablished in 1950